Sambhal  is a city located in the Sambhal district of Uttar Pradesh state in India. The city lies approximately 158 kilometres (98 mi) east of New Delhi and 355 kilometres (220 mi) north-west of state capital Lucknow.

History

Sambhal is identified with Shambhala, which is mentioned as the birthplace of Kalki, the next incarnation of Vishnu, in the Puranas. This was borrowed into the Buddhist mythology of Tibetan Buddhism where it is described as a mythological kingdom and pure land beyond the Himalayas where the future Maitreya will emerge from.

Sambhal has been an urban center for hundreds of years. It was a prominent town during the medieval period. The painting shown here is a folio from the Baburnama, and depicts an award ceremony in Sultan Ibrahim Lodi's court before an expedition to Sambhal in the early 16th century.
Sambhal is said to have flourished under the rule of Akbar but subsequently deteriorated in popularity when Akbar's grandson Shah Jahan was made in charge of the city, and the capital of the province was shifted to Moradabad.

Demographics
As per provisional reports of the 2011 Census of India, the population of Sambhal city in 2011 was 221,334, of which 116,008 were male and 105,326 were female. Total literates in Sambhal city are 92,608 of which 51,382 are males while 41,226 are females. The average literacy rate in Sambhal city is 49.51 percent, of which male literacy was 52.27 percent and female 46.45 percent. The sex ratio of Sambhal city is 908 per 1,000 males and the child sex ratio of girls is 936 per 1,000 boys. Total children (0-6) in Sambhal city were 34,279 as per the records of Census India 2011. There were 17,702 boys and 16,577 girls. The children form 15.49% of the total population of Sambhal City.

Religions in Sambhal
Sambhal is Muslim majority city in India with approximately 77.67 % of city population following Islam as their religion.   Hinduism is second most common religion in city of Sambhal with approximately 22.00% following it. In Sambhal city, Christianity is followed by 0.12%, Jainism by 0.02%, Buddhism by 0.03 % and Sikhism by 0.06%.

Economy
Sambhal has the largest market of menthol in South Asia.
Most of menthol oil is exported to Western Europe and China.

Education
Sambhal has many schools and Inter colleges for primary and secondary level education affiliated with CBCS, ICSE, UP Board and Madarsa Board.

Degree Colleges
Mahatma Gandhi Memorial Post Graduate College
Government Degree College Sambhal

Distance Learning
IGNOU Study Center.

CBSE Board
Mission International Academy, Sambhal
Bal Vidya Senior Secondary Sambhal

UP Board
Al-Qadeer Higher Secondary School, Sambhal
Hind Inter College, Sambhal
S.B.S.J. Inter College, Sambhal
A.M.H.R.S. Inter College, Sambhal
Z.U. Inter College Sambhal

Transport
Sambhal is well connected to the major cities like Delhi, Moradabad, Aligarh, Bulandshahr, Gajraula and Badaun.
 
Sambhal has also a railway station known as Hatim Sarai Railway Station.

Notable people
Maharana Pratap
Chhatrapati Shivaji Maharaj
Brij Kishore Agrawal Lohe Wale
Dharmendra Singh Yadav

See also
 Shambhala
 Sambhal (Assembly constituency)

References 

Cities and towns in Sambhal district
Cities in Uttar Pradesh
Sambhal
Moradabad division